Tarphops elegans is a species of large-tooth flounders native to the northwest Pacific Ocean (Japan and South Korea).

References 

 Masuda, H., K. Amaoka, C. Araga, T. Uyeno and T. Yoshino, 1984. The fishes of the Japanese Archipelago. Vol. 1. Tokai University Press, Tokyo, Japan. 437 p.

External links 

 Tarphops elegans at fishbase

Paralichthyidae
Fish described in 1969
Fish of the Pacific Ocean